EPM Musique is a French record label that was created in 1986 by François Dacla, former president of RCA France. The label specializes in Chanson and its legacy. It is also dedicated to poetry, theater, and children's music.

"EPM is a French label whose interests include classic American jazz from the '30s through '50s." The label reissued earlier jazz recordings. Memphis Minnie's recordings were particularly reissued.

Most of its catalog is distributed by Universal Music Group.

Artists
 Léo Ferré
 Anne Sylvestre
 Michèle Bernard
 Georges Chelon
 Marc Ogeret
 Marc Robine
 Francis Lemarque
 Monique Morelli
 Hélène Martin
 Julos Beaucarne
 Diane Dufresne
 Anna Prucnal
 Anne Vanderlove
 Claudine Lebègue
 Francesca Solleville
 Marcel Dadi
 Pierre Dac
 Michel Buhler
 Jean Vasca
 Pierre Meige

References

External links
 Official website
 History page

French record labels
Jazz record labels